Baturin is a Russian masculine surname. Its feminine counterpart is Baturina. It may refer to:
 Ekaterina Baturina (gymnast) (born 1997), Russian artistic gymnast
 Ekaterina Baturina (luger) (born 1992), Russian luger
 Mate Baturina (born 1973), Croatian football player
 Nikolai Baturin (1936–2019), Estonian novelist and playwright
 Viktor Baturin (born 1956), Russian businessman, producer, brother of Yelena 
 Yelena Baturina (born 1963), Russian billionaire businesswoman
 Yuri Baturin (born 1949), Russian cosmonaut

Russian-language surnames